The Giro della Provincia di Reggio Calabria is a road bicycle race held annually in Province of Reggio Calabria, Italy. The race was a single-day race until 2005. It was not held in 2006 or 2007, but returned in 2008 as a three-day stage race. In 2009, the Giro was a single-day race, and in 2010, it was a stage race spanning four days. In 2011, it was again a three-day race, while in 2012, the race spanned two days.

Winners

Leo–Chlorodont

References

External links
List of winners 
Palmarès by memoire-du-cyclisme.net 

UCI Europe Tour races
Cycle races in Italy
Recurring sporting events established in 1920
1920 establishments in Italy